The Cluster Innovation Centre (CIC) is a Government of India funded institute established under the aegis of the University of Delhi. It has been founded in 2011 and introduced Innovation as a credit based course for the first time in India.

Objectives 

University of Delhi has set up Cluster Innovation Centre (CIC) with the objective of fostering an ecosystem of innovation and connecting research with application for the benefit of society.  The CIC aims to support application oriented research to solve real world problems by developing ideas into innovative applications that can be commercialized successfully.  The CIC will focus on developing affordable innovations that reach a large number of people and at the same time are commercially viable to be sustainable and relevant.
The main objectives of the Cluster Innovation Centre are:

 Encourage an environment of innovation in the system
 Develop innovative degree programs.
 Educate and sensitize students, teachers by launching schemes on innovation programmes in colleges
 Select ideas with potential by conducting training/orientation programmes/modules on innovation and researches
 Develop ideas into innovative applications
 Facilitate collaborations and partnerships with industry, academia and other stakeholders
 Commercialize innovations and take them to the end users
 Develop meaningful linkage with various segments of society.

References 

 DU launches CIC, Education Times 
 DU launches CIC,MSM News 
 Initiative of National Innovation Council 
Office of the Advisor to Prime Minister on Public Information Infrastructure & Innovations   
 Prime Minister's speech on CIC  
CSIR Linkage 
DRDO, Ministry of Defence and CIC MOU 
QS Rankings 
https://web.archive.org/web/20120425231602/http://innovationcouncil.gov.in/
http://iii.gov.in/.../innovation/University_Innovation_Cluster.pdf
http://www.siid.org.in/index.php?option=com_content&view=article&id=164:india-to-set-up-cluster-innovation-centres&catid=41:news
http://www.bhu.ac.in/notice/jul15/dic/cnmhrd.pdf

Delhi University
Innovation in India